Pray is a census-designated place and unincorporated community in Park County, Montana, United States, in the Paradise Valley. The town was founded in 1907 by Valentine Eggar, an entrepreneur. He named it after Congressman Charles Nelson Pray. Its population was 681 as of the 2010 census. Pray has a post office with ZIP code 59065, which opened on December 8, 1909.

The community is located on Highway 540 (East River Road), on the Yellowstone River. It is 22 miles from Livingston, and 30 miles from Yellowstone National Park. "Pray offers picturesque views of the Absaroka Mountain Range in the Gallatin National Forest." Chico Hot Springs Resort & Day Spa is located three miles south of the town.

In 2012, the five acres that make up the town of Pray were offered for sale by owner Barbara Walker, a photographer, for $1.4 million. The town "has been privately owned since it was founded." Walker's family began running the town in 1953; she became mayor in 2007.

"Being the owner of Pray doesn't have to be a difficult job," according to Ms. Walker.
"The town is pretty low-maintenance ... You collect the rent once a month and water and mow the lawn."

Demographics

References

External links 

Census-designated places in Park County, Montana
Census-designated places in Montana
Unincorporated communities in Montana
Unincorporated communities in Park County, Montana
Populated places established in 1907
1907 establishments in Montana